Terra di nessuno is an album by the Italian singer-songwriter Francesco De Gregori, released in 1987.

The song "Mimì sarà" was later sung by Mia Martini.

Track listing 
All songs by Francesco De Gregori.

"Il canto delle sirene"
"Pilota di guerra"
"Capatàz"
"Pane e castagne"
"Nero"
"Mimì sarà"
"Spalle larghe"
"I matti"
"Vecchia valigia"

1987 albums
Francesco De Gregori albums
CBS Records albums